is a Japanese sports shooter. He competed in the men's 25 metre rapid fire pistol event at the 2016 Summer Olympics.

References

External links
 
 

1971 births
Living people
Japanese male sport shooters
Olympic shooters of Japan
Shooters at the 2016 Summer Olympics
Asian Games medalists in shooting
Asian Games silver medalists for Japan
Shooters at the 2002 Asian Games
Shooters at the 2006 Asian Games
Shooters at the 2010 Asian Games
Shooters at the 2014 Asian Games
Shooters at the 2018 Asian Games
Medalists at the 2006 Asian Games
21st-century Japanese people